Survivor Philippines is a Philippine television reality competition show broadcast by GMA Network. The show is the Philippine version of the television series Survivor. Originally hosted by Paolo Bediones, it premiered on September 15, 2008, on the network's Telebabad line up. The show concluded on February 19, 2012, with a total of 269 episodes and 4 seasons. Richard Gutierrez served as the host for the final two seasons.

Format

The show follows the same general format as the other editions of the show. The players are split between two or three "tribes", are taken to a remote isolated location and are forced to live off the land with meager supplies for 39 days (36 in the Celebrity Showdown seasons). Frequent physical and mental challenges are used to pit the teams against each other for rewards, such as food or luxuries, or for "immunity", forcing the other tribe to attend "Tribal Council", where they must vote off one of their members.

When 10 players are remaining, the tribes are merged into a single tribe, and competitions are on an individual basis; winning immunity prevents that player from being voted out. All of the players that are voted out at this stage form the "Tribal Council Jury". Once down to three people (two in the 1st season), a final Tribal Council is held where the remaining players plead their case to the Jury as to why they should win the game. The jury then votes for which player should be considered the "Pinoy Sole Survivor" and be awarded the grand prize of P3,000,000.

Seasons

Deviations

While the show was aired on a daily basis rather than once a week, all elements of the Survivor franchise were otherwise present. The show uses the theme music for the British version composed by Russ Landau, who made the Ancient Voices series of theme scores for the American version. It has further been re-arranged and added with tribal and ethnic flavors by local Filipino composer Diwa de Leon and chant vocals were performed by Evan Britanico.

One unique difference in this franchise is in the status of castaways who are evacuated to the hospital nearest to the setting of the game. Instead of being declared as eliminated at the point of evacuation, a castaway being sent to the hospital due to apparent injury or ailment is reminded to return to the game within 24 hours; otherwise, they are officially declared as eliminated from the game. One exception was with Survivor Philippines: Celebrity Doubles Showdown castaway, Stef Prescott, who had been brought to a hospital in Manila after she was bitten by a Philippine cobra at Bulan camp. She was on treatment and observation for two days. Throughout the two-day absence from the game, she missed the actual Tribal Shuffle twist, a Tribal Immunity Challenge, and a Tribal Council. She came back on Day 13. Of the eight castaways across four seasons so far who were sent to the hospital with this reminder, all returned to the game, with one (Niña Ortiz from the first season) deciding to leave soon after her return from the hospital due to injury.

Another deviation in this franchise is the choice of the merge name, which is done beforehand by the producers. The merged tribe's name normally follows the naming pattern of those of the initial competing tribes. Many other Survivor versions usually let members of the new merged tribe make up their new tribal name.

In another deviation, the reunion specials were pre-recorded and were aired in the first Sunday after the final results were announced, which commonly happened in Fridays. One exception was with the reunion special of the fourth season, to be aired in the second Sunday after the live finale. In the American editions, the reunion special is usually aired live immediately after the final results are announced.

Ratings

Accolades

References

External links
 

 
2008 Philippine television series debuts
2012 Philippine television series endings
Filipino-language television shows
GMA Network original programming
GMA Integrated News and Public Affairs shows
Philippine reality television series
Philippine television series based on non-Philippine television series